The U.S. Post Office and Courthouse-Aberdeen, in Aberdeen, South Dakota, was built in 1936 with Art Deco features.

It was listed on the National Register of Historic Places in 2006.  It served historically as a government office building, as a post office, and as a courthouse.

See also 

Yule marble
List of United States post offices

References 

Art Deco courthouses
Courthouses on the National Register of Historic Places in South Dakota
Art Deco architecture in South Dakota
Courthouses in South Dakota
Post office buildings on the National Register of Historic Places in South Dakota
Government buildings completed in 1936
Buildings and structures in Aberdeen, South Dakota
National Register of Historic Places in Brown County, South Dakota